Le Châtelard-Frontière railway station is a railway station in the municipality of Finhaut, in the Swiss canton of Valais. It is located on the  gauge Martigny–Châtelard line of Transports de Martigny et Régions. The station is last one in Switzerland before the line crosses into France.

Services 
 the following services stop at Le Châtelard-Frontière:

References

External links 
 
 

Railway stations in the canton of Valais
Transports de Martigny et Régions stations